Kujan may refer to:
 Kujan, Chaharmahal and Bakhtiari
 Kujan, Ahar, East Azerbaijan Province
 Kujan, Varzaqan, East Azerbaijan Province